Chinnagudur is a Mandal in Mahabubabad district, Telangana.

References
 villageinfo.in

Mahabubabad district
Mahabubabad